Antoine Düss (August 14, 1840 – May 5, 1924) was a Swiss botanist.

Père Düss was born in Hasle, Switzerland, graduated from the Gymnasium in Luzern and entered the Congregation du Saint-Esprit et du Saint-Coeur de Marie in Paris. Titled variably as Abbé, Pére (Father) or Reverend, he held teaching positions at the Collége de Fort de France on Martinique and at the College de Basse-Terre on Guadeloupe. He collected botanical specimens mainly on Guadeloupe and its dependencies and Martinique, but made also collecting trips to Antigua, Barbuda, Dominica, and Saint Lucia.

He is honoured in the naming of Dussiella, which is a genus of fungi within the Clavicipitaceae family, and Dussia, which is a genus of flowering plants in the family Fabaceae.

Sources
 Urban, Ignaz. Notae biographicae, Symb. Antill. 3:14,1900.
 Detailed biography

Complete bibliography
 WorldCat

References

External links 

 

Botanists with author abbreviations
Bryologists
Pteridologists
Swiss mycologists
1840 births
1924 deaths
19th-century Swiss botanists
Botanists active in the Caribbean
20th-century Swiss botanists